Roberto Manrique (born April 23, 1979) is an Ecuadorian model, and actor best known for his roles in telenovelas. Starting his career in Ecuador, and later doing telenovelas for Telemundo in Colombia.

Biography

He was born April 23, 1979, in Guayaquil – Ecuador, under the sign of Taurus, the last of five children. Roberto always stood out within the family circle for being a curious child with general knowledge, communications, arts, and creativity .

Xavier Manrique's father, a renowned cardiologist of his country and his mother Mencha Miranda, a dedicated educator, gave Roberto a family that supported the development of skills and talents grew so motivated to discover their potential.

Roberto studied his years at the Liceo Panamericano primary, where he was involved in all kinds of artistic activities that particularly stood out as a student participation. It also showed interest in the topics of social awareness, as part of groups like the Nature Foundation and undertaking campaigns that touched these issues on their own initiative and their friends like.

"I remember when I was 8 or 9 years, we had a club of friends, which sold all sorts of things in the doorways of our homes, from popcorn to wooden coasters painted for us was to raise funds for social projects . Met scholarships to a child and feel of the work done was of absolute fullness, felt that we were changing the world. "

At the time of the school, Roberto studied at the traditional high school Javier in Guayaquil, where he distinguished himself for his creativity in the projects he undertook. "The high school to me was a period that involved major challenges of adaptation and growth level was the confrontation of values education I had in my home, with the real world, with the pressure of adolescents and the desire to be accepted .

When choosing a career, Roberto chose the Social Communication with a concentration in Graphic Design at the Universidad Casa Grande in Guayaquil. "I remember it as one of the best times of my life, in which I could discover and develop my creativity , expands my personality and discover the career potential it had "While studying experienced and performed several jobs and trades, including Cinemark teller, TV presenter and creative advertising at BBDO, where he started out as a promising publicist. However, he decided to leave these jobs to concentrate on finishing his college career that culminated with honors since Roberto received the award for most creative student, he  graduated in Technical Advertising (2000) and its degree in Communications (2002).

Upon completion of this phase of education and pursue professional communication Spiral mounted an advertising agency in order to work in Social Marketing. Despite the economic success that this company is represented, the fullness wasn't part of his life, and felt dissatisfied "For a year I thought I was happy, that was what I wanted, but it was the success that made me believe that so was, then I realized that I'm not made for an office or a computer, I need to create beyond ... with my body. "

To take a radical turn to his life, he closed his agency and traveled to Peru, where he worked as a waiter one time free of responsibilities as he wished. "Causality of life, I ended up stuck in an acting workshop that Productions Guana people gave me, that's where the magic happened and I discovered my passion, I discovered the freedom and the challenge of standing on a stage, the dedication required to take someone's life and nudity that it faces in vulnerability the theater. "

For health complications from his father who had been diagnosed with cancer decide to return to the country and pursuing a career in acting. A short time later, Roberto received his first acting opportunity and enter the talent to be part of a series called "The Sorceress "in which he plays an antagonist, since this project will definitely open the television set in Ecuador for three years and performs a series of characters in such productions as" I sell black eyes "," Jocelito "," My Premiums "" Singles without Commitment "," Archives of Fate, "" Heart Dominated "also venturing into the boards with plays such as" Humor of Chekhov one-act "," Cultural Pentagram "and" Venice. "" I am infinitely grateful that television has led me to the theater because that's really where I trained as an actor, I consider myself very lucky to have spent that process. "

After building a successful career in his native country Roberto decides it's time to go and seek new horizons and new opportunities and decides to move to Colombia from which to project itself internationally thanks to the great entertainment industry in the country neighbor "When you're attentive to life and listen to your heart, you know what your path is and no risk of being mistaken, for me Colombia was a natural movement of life, something I knew I had to do without giving room of fear or doubt. Part of this certainly gave me my father, shortly before he died he told my family that no one should dwell on this trip because I will find my destiny, after my dad passed I went to Colombia "

In Colombia I achieved several roles in television and theater: In the shadow of the volcano, Fathers and Children, That's life, murdered women, Victoria and Doña Bárbara, which airs on Telemundo.

In Colombia things weren't always easy for Roberto, start from scratch in a new market involved a series of challenges to face and he were meant great opportunities for growth as he tells us. "Colombia has been the best time of my life, and precisely because it was not an easy undertaking, I had to deal with economic distress, unemployment, loneliness, but that caused me to develop aspects that did not have before such as thrift, determination, discipline, absolute confidence towards life and toward myself. "

One of the first projects in which Roberto attended the play "In the shadow of the volcano," a story that deals with child sexual abuse, along with great actresses and actors like Alejandra Borrero, Gustavo Angarita, Diana Angel. " It was an honor for me to share the stage with great actors, definitely a learning experience in my acting career and the opportunity to bring my work to open dialogue on a topic as important and on which there is both taboo. "After participating in the series "Fathers and Sons", "That's life" and "Killer Women", and participating in countless advertising campaigns.

Finally Roberto achieved the role of the noble and proud Sebastian Villanueva in the telenovela "Victoria" at Telemundo, pulling its international projection. But this was only the beginning, then saw Roberto on the soap opera Dona Barbara, playing Maria Nieves, a cowboy sullen, bad-tempered and rude that concealed a very sensitive and we took more of a laugh and an occasional tear. Then came the moment that Roberto has secured its first international starring role on the soap opera "The Victorine" also by Telemundo. "I am very grateful to the life of a chance to be part of this project is far from a romance novel, it is more like a suspense thriller and action, with the possibility of developing a complex and interesting protagonist, alongside a cast of first. In 2013 participates in soap opera Marido En Alquiler  playing Kike.

Personal life 
On August 27, 2021, Manrique publicly came out as gay and said that he had been in a relationship with his current boyfriend for seven years.

Filmography

Theater 
 2014: Los hombres no mienten - Maximiliano
 2014: Mitad y Mitad
 2012: Confesiones del Pene
 2012: Herejía
 2010: El Clon
 2009: Victorinos
 2009: La gata sobre el tejado caliente 
 2006: Humor de Chéjov en un acto 
 2005: Pentagrama cultural 
 2004: Venecia 
 2003: A la sombra del volcán

References

External links 
 
 Official website

Ecuadorian male models
Ecuadorian male stage actors
Ecuadorian male telenovela actors
Ecuadorian male television actors
People from Guayaquil
1979 births
Living people
Ecuadorian LGBT people
Gay actors